Steal syndrome  may refer to:
Cardiac steal syndrome
Subclavian steal syndrome, often associated with fainting, and typically due to atherosclerosis
Vascular access steal syndrome, a problem related to a surgically created vascular access (fistula) for hemodialysis

See also
Steele-Richardson-Olszewski syndrome, alternative name for progressive supranuclear palsy